Plum River is a river of southwestern New Caledonia. It flows into the sea to the west of the Plum village. It is a short river, little more than an incised stream. The Plum Swamp lies in the river system.

References

Rivers of New Caledonia